The Civic Theatre is a large heritage combination performing-arts theatre, live-music venue, and cinema seating 2,378 people in Auckland, New Zealand. First opened on 20 December 1929, it underwent a major renovation and two-year conservation effort in the late 1990s, and was reopened on 20 December 1999 (its 70th birthday). It is a famous example of the atmospheric theatre style wherein lighting and interior design create the illusion of an open sky complete with twinkling stars, giving the audience the impression of being seated in an outdoor auditorium at night. The Civic is managed by Auckland Live, a business unit of Auckland Unlimited.

Significance

The Civic is internationally significant as the largest surviving atmospheric cinema in Australasia and was the first purpose-built cinema of its kind in New Zealand. It is also known for its Indian-inspired foyer, which includes seated Buddhas, twisted columns and domed ceilings. The main auditorium is of a similarly exotic style, imitating a Moorish garden with turrets, Minarets, spires and tiled roofs, as well as two life-sized Abyssinian panther statues. The Civic accommodated 2,750 people at its opening, and is still the largest theatre in New Zealand even at its current reduced-seating capacity.

History
The theatre was the creation of Thomas O'Brien, who built a movie empire in Auckland's inner suburbs in the 1920s, and brought the atmospheric cinema to New Zealand when he opened Dunedin's Moorish-style Empire De Luxe Theatre in 1928. O'Brien persuaded a group of wealthy Auckland businessmen to build a massive atmospheric cinema on Queen Street, and managed to secure a £180,000 loan from the Bank of New Zealand for the project. The cinema was built by Fletcher Construction over eight months. However, the BNZ loan and soaring construction costs caught the attention of the New Zealand Parliament as the final price tag ballooned to over £200,000 (approximately NZ$18.9 million in 2016).

The Civic opened amid great fanfare in December 1929, but the onset of the Great Depression contributed to disappointing attendances, as did O'Brien's stubborn insistence on showing British rather than the more popular American films; he eventually declared bankruptcy. After several modifications during the following decades, the theatre was eventually restored to an approximation of its original design in the late-1990s.

The Wintergarden, an unground ballroom n the Civic complex, became one of the major centres of entertainment for American soldiers who were stationed in Auckland during World War II. During this period, the venue was host to events such as concerts by Bob Hope, speeches by Eleanor Roosevelt and General Bernard Montgomery, and erotic dances by Freda Stark.

By the 1960s, the Civic struggled as a venue, as the theatre was too large for modern film audiences, and faced increased competition in the 1990s after the Aotea Centre opened nearby. In 1993, the building's lease reverted back to the Auckland City Council, who considered demolishing the venue. After a campaign by a protest group named the Friends of the Civic, the council spent $41.8 million dollars to refurbish the venue. It reopened in 1999 for both film and theatre, followed by the Wintergarden re-opening in 2000.

The theatre also gained some fame when its interiors were used in Peter Jackson's 2005 remake of King Kong, standing in for a New York theatre called The Alhambra.

References

External links
 Photographs of the Civic Theatre held in Auckland Libraries' heritage collection.

Buildings and structures in Auckland
Heritage New Zealand Category 1 historic places in the Auckland Region
Cinemas in New Zealand
Theatres in Auckland
Theatres completed in 1929
Atmospheric theatres
1929 establishments in New Zealand
1920s architecture in New Zealand
Auckland CBD